The Ambassador from New Zealand to Belgium is New Zealand's foremost diplomatic representative in the Kingdom of Belgium, and in charge of New Zealand's diplomatic mission in Belgium.

The embassy is located in Brussels, Belgium's capital city.  New Zealand has maintained a resident ambassador in Belgium since 1967.  The Ambassador to Belgium is concurrently accredited to Luxembourg, Romania, Bulgaria and Moldova.

List of heads of mission

Consuls to Belgium
 Ken Piddington (1963–1964)
 Ted Farnon (1964–1965)

Ambassadors to Belgium

Non-resident ambassadors, resident in France
 Dick Hutchens (1965–1967)

Resident ambassadors
 Merwyn Norrish (1967–1973)
 Ian Stewart (1973–1977)
 Graham Ansell (1977–1981)
 John G. McArthur (1981–1983)
 Terence O'Brien (1983–1986)
 Gerry Thompson (1986–1990)
 David Gamble (1990–1994)
 Derek Leask (1994–1999)
 Dell Higgie (1999–2003)
 Wade Armstrong (2003–2007)
 Peter Kennedy (2007–2011)
 Paula Wilson (August 2012–December 2015)
 Gregory Andrews (October 2016–present)

References

 New Zealand Heads of Overseas Missions: Belgium.  New Zealand Ministry of Foreign Affairs and Trade.  Retrieved on 2008-03-29.

Belgium, Ambassadors from New Zealand to
 
New Zealand